3-Headed Shark Attack is a 2015 American direct-to-video science fiction action film developed by The Asylum and starring Danny Trejo, Karrueche Tran and Rob Van Dam. Directed by Christopher Ray, it is a sequel to 2-Headed Shark Attack (2012).

Plot
A 3-headed great white shark attacks an atoll where a group of teenagers is partying, killing all of them except one, Mark, who was on a buoy while the rest of the teens were at the beach. The shark then attacks the Persephone, an underwater research facility studying the Pacific Garbage Patch. The resulting damage causes the facility to explode, killing everybody inside. However, marine biologists Ted Nelson and Laura Thomas escape. A group of activists touring the lab consisting of Greg, Ryan Bennett, Omar, Alison, and college graduate Maggie Peterson, who applied for a job at the facility, also escape. Maggie is also Greg's ex-girlfriend. The island the facility is based on begins to flood, and the group swims out to the activists' boat. As a result, Laura and Omar are eaten in the process. The others reach the ship; the shark follows them as they drive. Ryan manages to contact fisherman Max Burns over the radio and asks for help. Burns is hesitant to believe them but reluctantly agrees to help them.

The shark begins to head toward a party boat carrying teenagers. The group attempts to warn them, but they are too late, as the shark consistently rams into the ship, knocking numerous people into the water where they are eaten. The group manages to board the boat in order to help injured passengers, and Maggie and Nelson are enlisted as help by passengers Stanley and Rosemarie Grant to help find Rosemarie's boyfriend Howard. He had disappeared into the abandoned dining area during the chaos. Maggie, Stanley, and Nelson find him and make their way to the top deck, although, in the process, the shark jumps onto the back of the boat and eats Nelson. The group realizes they can no longer stay due to the ship sinking and board the activists' boat with Stanley, Rosemarie, and Howard in tow. However, Ryan stays behind and attempts to kill the shark by jumping onto its back with an axe. He manages to clip onto the back of the shark, and it soon kills him in retaliation. Running low on fuel, the group is forced to stop at the atoll that the shark attacked earlier.

Meanwhile, Burns and his two men attempt to kill the shark, and Burns' men are killed in the process. Burns manages to decapitate the shark's middle head, seemingly killing it. Burns finds the rest of the group. Surprisingly, the shark recovers, grows three more heads in place of the missing head, and eats Burns.

Traumatized by Burns' death, the group runs inland, meeting Mark. Maggie theorizes that the shark is attracted to pollution and that the heads are becoming more aggressive with each other. The group finds two motorboats and begins to drive away from the island. The shark attacks one of them carrying Alison, Rosemarie, Howard, and Mark and kills all of them. Meanwhile, Maggie, Stanley, and Greg manage to attract the shark's attention by throwing garbage bags into the water. Stanley's hand is bitten off in the process. Losing faith, Stanley sacrifices himself by allowing the shark heads to fight over him, resulting in three of the shark's heads getting bitten off, and the shark itself dies of blood loss. Maggie and Greg rekindle their relationship as a helicopter arrives to rescue them.

Cast
 Danny Trejo as Max Burns
 Karrueche Tran as Maggie Peterson
 Jaason Simmons as Dr. Ted Nelson
 Rob Van Dam as Stanley
 Jena Sims as Dr. Laura Thomas
 Brad Mills as Greg
 Scott Reynolds as Ryan Bennett
 Rico Ball as Omar
 Dawn Hamil as Alison
 Bob Constance as Brad
 James Poule as Brian
 Stephen Norris as Steve
 Larry Gamell Jr. as Dr. Leonard
 Mark Nager as Seth
 Preston Simmons as Zach
 Stephen Harwick as Mark
 Jazy Berlin as Polly
 Anna Mercedes Morris as Sasha
 Kayla Campbell as Lindsey
 Brianna Ferris as Rosemarie Grant
 Nestor Fuentes as Maurice
 Carlos Rivera as Howard Grant
 Jacqueline Schmidt as Vanessa
 Eric C. Schmitz as Betts
 Scott Warner as Sandoval
 Cody Lee as Tyler

Sequels
A third film in the series, 5-Headed Shark Attack, was released on Syfy on July 30, 2017, and a fourth film, 6-Headed Shark Attack, was released on August 18, 2018.

References

External links
 Official site at The Asylum
 

2015 films
2015 direct-to-video films
2015 horror films
2015 independent films
2010s science fiction horror films
2015 science fiction action films
2010s action horror films
2010s monster movies
American direct-to-video films
American action horror films
American monster movies
American natural horror films
American sequel films
Direct-to-video horror films
Films directed by Christopher Ray
Films about sharks
The Asylum films
Films about shark attacks
Syfy original films
Films set in the Pacific Ocean
2010s English-language films
2010s American films